Oukwanyama (Uukwanyama in the neighbouring Oshindonga dialect) is a traditional kingdom of the Ovambo people in what is today northern Namibia and southern Angola. Its capital is Ehole.

List of rulers
The Oukwanyama Kingdom and King Mandume Museum is located at Omhedi. They speak the Kwanyama dialect.

The list of Oukwanyama kings, their kingdoms and estimated reigning time consists of;

 Kambungu ka Muheya (Onambambi-Onehula) around 1600
Shitenhu (Oshiteve) around 1600
Kawengeko (Ondjiva) around 1600
Mushindi ua Kanhene Uandja (Ondjiva) around 1600
Kavonga ka Haindongo (Ondjiva) around 1600
Heita ya Muvale (Ondjiva) around 1690
Hautolonde ya Uandja (Ondjiva) 1755-1760
Mutota wa Haipiya (Ondjiva) 1760-1766
Shimbilinga sha Nailambi (Ondjiva) 1766-1806
Haihambo ya Mukwanhuli (Ondjiva) 1806-1807
Hamangulu Nahambo ya Naivala (Ondjiva) 1807-1811
Haimbili ya Haufiku (Ondjiva) 1811-1858
Haikukutu yaShinangolo (Ondjiva) 1858-1859
Sheefeni sha Hamukuyu (Ondjiva) 1859-1862
Mweshipandeka ya Shaningika (Ondjiva) 1862-1882
Namhadi ya Mweihanyeka (Ondjiva) 1882-1884
Ueyulu ya Hedimbi (Ondjiva) 1884-1904
Nande ya Hedimbi (Omukumbwaimbi) 1904–1911)
Mandume ya Ndemufayo (Ondjiva) 1911-1917
Cornelius Mwetupunga Shelungu (Omhedi) 1998-2005
Martha Mwadinomho ya Kristian ya Nelumbu (Omhedi) 2005 –

See also
:Category:Christian mission stations in Oukwanyama

References

External links
 World Statesmen.org

History of Namibia
Ovambo